Mikhampur  is a village development committee in Parsa District in the Narayani Zone of southern Nepal. At the time of the 1991 Nepal census it had a population of 2949.

References

Populated places in Parsa District